The John Sutton House, located at 140 Main St. in Paris, Idaho, was built in 1880.  It was listed on the National Register of Historic Places in 1982.

It is a -story, shiplap-sided frame house "with an I-house profile."

The house is "architecturally significant as a variation on the I-house, rare in Paris, and for its unique and distinctly handmade ornament. In basic plan, this house conforms to the I-house type, a form found throughout Idaho, but noticeably concentrated in areas of Mormon settlement."

References

Houses on the National Register of Historic Places in Idaho
Houses completed in 1880
Bear Lake County, Idaho